Abdou Rachid Thiam is a Senegalese biophysicist and research director at the French National Centre for Scientific Research and Ecole Normale Superieure in Paris, France (UMR 8023), where he studies physical mechanisms regulating the dynamics of lipid droplets in cells and in vitro.

He was the recipient of a CNRS Bronze medal in 2020.

Thiam received a Bachelor of Science from ESPCI Paris before conducting his doctoral research at Pierre and Marie Curie University in Paris on the study of the stability of emulsions using microfluidics. After his PhD, he moved to Yale University in 2012 under a Marie Curie fellowship to conduct postdoctoral research in the team of Nobel prize Laureate James E. Rothman, before starting his research group at CNRS in 2014.

Most cited papers as an independent researcher
Thiam AR, Beller M. The why, when and how of lipid droplet diversity. Journal of cell science. 2017 Jan 15;130(2):315-24. (Cited 158 times, according to Google Scholar. )  
Wang H, Becuwe M, Housden BE, Chitraju C, Porras AJ, Graham MM, Liu XN, Thiam AR, Savage DB, Agarwal AK, Garg A. Seipin is required for converting nascent to mature lipid droplets. elife. 2016 Aug 26;5:e16582. (Cited 215 times, according to Google Scholar  )

References

External links 
 

Senegalese scientists
ESPCI Paris alumni
Pierre and Marie Curie University alumni
Year of birth missing (living people)
Living people